The World Cyber Games 2006 was held from October 18 to October 22, 2006 in Monza, Italy.

Official games

PC games

 FIFA Soccer 2006
 Counter-Strike 1.6
 Need For Speed: Most Wanted
 StarCraft: Brood War
 Warcraft III: The Frozen Throne
 Dawn of War: Winter Assault

Xbox games

 Dead or Alive 4
 Project Gotham Racing 3

Special tournament game

 PangYa

Invitational tournament game

 Carom 3D
 Quake 4 (All Stars)

Results

Official

Special

Invitational

References

World Cyber Games events
2006 in Italian sport
2006 in esports
Esports in Italy